The tayra (Eira barbara) is an omnivorous animal from the weasel family, native to the Americas. It is the only species in the genus Eira.

Tayras are also known as the tolomuco or perico ligero in Central America, motete in Honduras, irara in Brazil, san hol or viejo de monte in the Yucatan Peninsula, and high-woods dog (or historically chien bois) in Trinidad. The genus name Eira is derived from the indigenous name of the animal in Bolivia and Peru, while barbara means "strange" or "foreign".

Description
Tayras are long, slender animals with an appearance similar to that of weasels and martens. Males are larger, and slightly more muscular, than females. They have short, dark brown to black fur which is relatively uniform across the body, limbs, and tail, except for a yellow or orange spot on the chest. The fur on the head and neck is much paler, typically tan or greyish in colour. Albino, white, or yellowish individuals are also known, and are not as rare among tayras as they are among other mustelids.

The feet have toes of unequal length with tips that form a strongly curved line when held together. The claws are short and curved, but strong, being adapted for climbing and running rather than digging. The pads of the feet are hairless, but are surrounded by stiff sensory hairs. The head has small, rounded ears, long whiskers, and black eyes with a blue-green shine. Like most other mustelids, tayras possess anal scent glands, but these are not particularly large, and their secretion is not as pungent as in other species, and is not used in self defence. The species have a unique throat patch that can be used for individual identification.

Range and habitat

Tayras are found across most of South America east of the Andes, except for Uruguay, eastern Brazil, and all but the most northerly parts of Argentina. They are also found across the whole of Central America, in Mexico as far north as southern Veracruz, and on the island of Trinidad. They are generally found in only tropical and subtropical forests, although they may cross grasslands at night to move between forest patches, and they also inhabit cultivated plantations and croplands.

Subspecies
At least seven subspecies are currently recognised:

E. b. barbara (northern Argentina, Paraguay, western Bolivia and central and southern Brazil)
E. b. inserta (South Guatemala to central Costa Rica)
E. b.  madeirensis (west Ecuador and northern Brazil)
E. b. peruana (the eastern Andes in Peru and Bolivia)
E. b.  poliocephala (eastern Venezuela, Trinidad, the Guianas, and northeastern Brazil)
E. b. senex (central Mexico to northern Honduras)
E. b.  sinuensis (Colombia, western Venezuela, northern Ecuador, and Panama)

Behaviour and diet
Tayras are diurnal animals, although occasionally active during the evening or at night. The social behaviour of tayras is not well understood. Assumed solitary, they have been seen in larger groups, presumably of mother and her larger offspring. They are opportunistic omnivores, hunting rodents and other small mammals, as well as birds, lizards, other reptiles, and invertebrates, and climbing trees to get fruit and honey. They locate prey primarily by scent, having relatively poor eyesight, and actively chase it once located, rather than stalking or using ambush tactics.

They are expert climbers, using their long tails for balance. On the ground or on large horizontal tree limbs, they use a bounding gallop when moving at high speeds. They can also leap from treetop to treetop when pursued. They generally avoid water, but are capable of swimming across rivers when necessary.

They live in hollow trees, or burrows in the ground. Individual animals maintain relatively large home ranges, with areas up to  having been recorded. They may travel at least  in a single night.

An interesting instance of caching has been observed among tayras: a tayra will pick unripe green plantains, which are inedible, and leave them to ripen in a cache, coming back a few days later to consume the softened pulp.

Reproduction
Tayras breed year-round, with the females entering estrus several times each year for 3 to 20 days at a time. Unlike some other mustelids, tayras do not exhibit embryonic diapause, and gestation lasts from 63 to 67 days. The female gives birth to one to three young, which she cares for alone.

Their eyes open at 35 to 47 days, and they leave the den shortly thereafter. They begin to take solid food around 70 days of age, and are fully weaned by 100 days. Hunting behaviour begins as early as three months, and the mother initially brings her young wounded or slow prey to practise on as they improve their killing technique. The young are fully grown around 6 months old, and leave their mother to establish their own territory by 10 months.

Conservation
Wild tayra populations are slowly shrinking, especially in Mexico, due to habitat destruction for agricultural purposes. The species is listed as being of least concern.

Gallery

References

Further reading

 Nowak, Ronald M. (2005). Walker's Carnivores of the World. Baltimore: Johns Hopkins Press. 
 Emmons, L.H. (1997). Neotropical Rainforest Mammals, 2nd ed. University of Chicago Press 

Guloninae
Carnivorans of Central America
Carnivorans of South America
Mammals of the Caribbean
Mammals of Argentina
Mammals of Central America
Mammals of Bolivia
Mammals of Brazil
Mammals of Colombia
Mammals of Ecuador
Mammals of French Guiana
Mammals of Guyana
Mammals of Mexico
Mammals of Paraguay
Mammals of Peru
Mammals of Suriname
Mammals of Trinidad and Tobago
Mammals of Venezuela
Fauna of the Amazon
Mammals described in 1758
Taxa named by Carl Linnaeus